Francisco Feuillassier Abalo (born 12 May 1998), commonly known as Franchu, is an Argentinian professional footballer who plays as a right winger for Spanish club FC Cartagena, on loan from SD Eibar.

Club career
Born in Mar del Plata, Franchu joined Real Madrid's La Fábrica in March 2009 at the age of ten, from Cadetes de San Martín. Released by the club in 2011, he spent five years at Rayo Vallecano before rejoining Los Blancos in July 2016.

Franchu made his senior debut with the reserves on 3 September 2016, coming on as a late substitute for goalscorer Sergio Díaz in a 3–2 Segunda División B home win against SD Amorebieta. Definitely promoted to Castilla ahead of the 2017–18 season, he became a regular starter in Santiago Solari's side.

Franchu made his first team debut for Real Madrid on 26 October 2017, replacing fellow youth graduate Achraf Hakimi in a 2–0 away success over CF Fuenlabrada, for the season's Copa del Rey; he also featured in the second leg, starting and playing 60 minutes in a 2–2 draw at the Santiago Bernabéu Stadium. The following 7 April he scored his first senior goals, netting a brace for Castilla in a 4–2 home win against CCD Cerceda.

On 8 September 2020, Franchu joined Segunda División side CF Fuenlabrada on loan for the 2020–21 season. He made his professional debut on 13 September, replacing Mikel Iribas late into a 2–0 Segunda División home win against CD Lugo. Franchu scored his first goal for the club on 17 October in a 1-1 draw away against FC Cartagena.

On 9 July 2021, Franchu joined second division side SD Eibar on a free transfer, signing a three-year deal. On 28 July of the following year, after featuring rarely, he was loaned to fellow league team FC Cartagena for one year.

Personal life
Franchu's older brother Santiago is also a footballer. A midfielder, plays for Völsungur, he also played for Real Madrid and Rayo Vallecano before.

Career statistics

Club

References

External links
Real Madrid profile

1998 births
Living people
Sportspeople from Mar del Plata
Argentine footballers
Spanish footballers
Association football wingers
Segunda División players
Segunda División B players
Real Madrid Castilla footballers
CF Fuenlabrada footballers
Cadetes de San Martín players
Rayo Vallecano players
Real Madrid CF players
SD Eibar footballers
FC Cartagena footballers